The Association of Jewish Ex-Servicemen and Women (AJEX; prior to 1939, the Association of Jewish Ex-Servicemen, and from 1928 to 1939, the Jewish Ex-Servicemen's Legion) is a non-political charitable organization that focuses on issues affecting Jewish British former servicemen and women.

History 
The association is a non-political charitable organization that focuses on issues affecting Jewish British former servicemen and women, and was founded in Whitechapel in East London in 1928 as the Jewish Ex-Servicemen's Legion. In 1936 it changed its name to AJEX. It holds an annual Commemoration of Remembrance and Parade every November to pay tribute to servicemen and women who have died in battle. As of 2013, it had 40 branches in the United Kingdom.

See also
Jewish Military Museum

References 

Jewish charities based in the United Kingdom
Jewish organizations established in the 1920s
British veterans' organisations
1928 establishments in England